The Red Square Classic and the Moscow Classic are annual bonspiels (curling tournaments) on the men's World Curling Tour (WCT). The Red Square Classic is played outdoors at Red Square, while the Moscow Classic is played at the New League curling club in Moscow, Russia. Both events are held in early February within a week of each other.

The Red Square Classic ran as a solo event from 2014 to 2017. It was replaced by the Moscow Classic in 2018. In 2019, the event returned to Red Square, and in 2020 both events were held for the first time. In 2021, the events were cancelled and replaced by a mixed doubles event.

Past champions

Mixed doubles
Moscow first held a mixed doubles tour event in December 2019 called the ISS WCT Moscow Mixed Doubles.

References

World Curling Tour events
International curling competitions hosted by Russia
Sports competitions in Moscow
Red Square